Retrospective is the name of an anthology album by the music group Monkey House, which was released in 2013 on the Green Dolphin Music label. Monkey House is a rock/pop/jazz group led by Don Breithaupt. This release has a total of 44 tracks: 38 songs, plus six interviews. It includes almost every tune from their first two albums, Welcome to the Club (1992), and True Winter (1998), and also has four newer songs that were on the 2005 release entitled Big Money: Singles Remasters Rarities 1992-2005. Additionally, six tunes not previously released are on this anthology album, five of them being instrumentals, as well as the tune "I'm Not That Guy" from the Headquarters (2012 album) sessions, but had not been included on that album. Special guests include Little Feat drummer Richie Hayward and former Pat Metheny Group member David Blamires.

Track listing 
All songs written by Don Breithaupt

Personnel
Don Breithaupt - Lead and backup vocals, keyboards, percussion, arranger, producer
Rich Dodson - producer, guitar
Mark Kelso – drums on track 1, brushes, hi-hat
Richie Hayward - drums
Rick Gratton - drums
Pat Kilbride - bass on track 1
Mike Francis - guitar, electric sitar
John David (Dave) Dunlop - guitar
Kenny Vehkavaara - guitar
Asher Horowitz - guitar
Peter Smith - guitar
Carlos Lopes - guitar
Anthony Vanderburgh - guitar
Kevin Breit - guitar, mandolin, backup vocals
Burke Carroll - pedal steel guitar
Perry White – saxophone
John Johnson – saxophones, EWI
Tony Carlucci - trumpet
Dave Dunlop - cornet, trumpet
Gord Myers - trombone
Terry Promane - trombone
Rikki Rumball - backup vocals, lead vocal on tracks 20 & 33
David Blamires - backup vocals
Lorraine Lawson - backup vocals
Debbie Johnson - backup vocals
Suzanne Zrinscak - backup vocals
Densil Pinnock - backup vocals, scat & octave vocals on track 24
Jeff Breithaupt - character voice on track 13
Aashna - voices
MC Squared - rap lines on track 13
Ross Breithaupt - congas

References

External links 
 Current website
 Monkey House Facebook page

2013 albums